Asr-e Maa is a Persian language biweekly publication published in Iran.

History and profile
Asr-e Maa was established by the Organization of the Islamic Revolution Mojahedin (OIRM), a reformist political organization, in 1991 as a biweekly publication.

See also
List of newspapers in Iran

References

1991 establishments in Iran
Newspapers published in Iran
Persian-language newspapers
Publications established in 1991
Biweekly newspapers